Raluca Saita (born October 9, 1979 in Bucharest) is a Romanian film editor.

Biography
Raluca Saita is a film editor working in narrative, television and documentary, with over 8 years experience and an artistically background which complements her film education. From the age of 13 Raluca attends the art high school where she studies history of art, drawing and painting, and in 2002 she earns a BFA in Film Editing at The National University of Theater and Film in Bucharest (Awarded “Best Film School” at 2000 Munchen and Karlovy Vary Film Festivals). In 2009 she graduates The Edit Center in New York City and earns a Certificate of Art of Editing.

After receiving the BFA in Film Editing she works on several short movies and begins her work as an assistant film editor on features. Also after a few years Raluca has her own editing studio and starts freelancing for the largest production company in Romania, MediaPro Pictures, working on TV series and TV features. In the same time starts working on her first feature as a film editor "Emigrant", and also travels to New York where she edits as an assistant editor, some of the scenes for the movie The Winning Season, directed by James C. Strouse, starring Sam Rockwell and Emma Roberts, at The Edit Center.

Her editing work expands from shorts to features, narrative and documentary to TV series, indies and studio productions. Also Raluca works as a sound designer for some of the projects and in 2001 she wins Best Sound Award at the University's Film Festival.

Filmography

Editorial Department
The Winning Season (2009) directed by James C. Strouse
Emigrant (2009) directed by Florin Serban
One Second of Life (2009) directed by Ioan Carmazan
The J.H. Gunn Project (2009) directed by Shequeta Smith
Un film Simplu (2008) directed by Tom Gatsoulis
Cu un pas inainte (25 episodes, 2007) directed by Jesus del Cerro
Africa Straight on Ice (2007)directed by Razvan Muraru
Razbunarea (2006) directed by Adrian Sitaru
Barbatul sotului meu (2006) directed by Radu Apostol
A doua sansa (2006) directed by Adrian Sitaru
Inocenta furata (2006) directed by Alex Fotea
Pretul iubirii (2006) directed by Corina Radu
Cu inima indoita (2006) directed by Ioan Carmazan
Mama dupa ora 5 (2006) directed by Radu Apostol
Invat sa fiu mama ta (2006) directed by Adrian Batista
Dusmanul din casa (2006) directed by Peter Kerek
E dreptul meu! (2006) directed by Corina Radu
O lume a durerii (2006) directed by Mihai Bauman
Niciodata nu e prea tarziu (2006) directed by Alex Berceanu
Dragoste de mama (2006) directed by Ioan Carmazan
Mincinoasa (2006) directed by Adrian Sitaru
Continuitatea parcurilor (2006) directed by Radu Barbulescu
Băieți buni (2005) directed by Bogdan Barbulescu
Italiencele (2004) directed by Napoleon Helmis
Munceste acum! (2002) directed by Ion Puican
Conserve de familie (2001) directed by Ion Puican
The Flash (2001) directed by Andrei Butica
Mecano (2001) directed by Cristian Nemescu
Golem (2001) directed by Anatol Reghintovschi
Millenium (1999) directed by Adrian Alpentopp
Museum (1999) directed by Ion Puican
The Table (1998) directed by Ion Puican

Sound Department
The Flash (2001) directed by Andrei Butica
Mecano (2001)  directed by Cristian Nemescu
Golem (2001) directed by Anatol Reghintovschi
Millenium (1999) directed by Adrian Alpentopp
Museum (1999) directed by Ion Puican
The Table (1998) directed by Ion Puican

Awards 
2001 - Best Sound Prize - International Student Film Festival CineMAiubit

References

External links 
 Official site of Raluca Saita
 CineMagia - Raluca Saita
 CineFan - Raluca Saita
 

1979 births
Film people from Bucharest
Romanian film editors
Living people